Louis Oliver, III (born March 9, 1966) is an American former college and professional football player who was a safety in the National Football League (NFL) for eight seasons during the 1980s and 1990s.  Oliver played college football for the University of Florida, and was twice recognized as an All-American.  He was a first-round pick in the 1989 NFL Draft, and played professionally for the Miami Dolphins and the Cincinnati Bengals of the NFL.

Early life 

Oliver was born in Belle Glade, Florida in 1966.  He attended Glades Central High School in Belle Glade, and was a standout high school football player for the Glades Central Raiders.  Memorably, Oliver blocked two punts in the same game as a junior.

College career 

After graduating from high school, Oliver attended the University of Florida in Gainesville, Florida, where he was a walk-on player on head coach Galen Hall's Florida Gators football team in 1985.  Subsequently, Oliver not only earned an athletic scholarship, he became a starting free safety and team captain, and totaled 11 career interceptions.  He was a first-team All-Southeastern Conference (SEC) selection in 1987 and 1988, a first-team All-American in 1987 and a consensus first-team All-American in 1988, and a two-time SEC Academic Honor Roll honoree.  Oliver was also the recipient of the Gators' Fergie Ferguson Award recognizing the "senior football player who displays outstanding leadership, character and courage."

Oliver graduated from Florida with a bachelor's degree in criminal justice in 1989, and was inducted into the University of Florida Athletic Hall of Fame as a "Gator Great" in 2000.  In one of a series of articles written for The Gainesville Sun in 2006, the Sun sports editors chose him as No. 24 among the greatest 100 Gators from the first century of Florida football.

Professional career 

Oliver was selected by the Miami Dolphins in the first round (25th overall) of the 1989 NFL Draft, and played seven seasons for the Dolphins (–, –) and one season for the Cincinnati Bengals.  Oliver was reunited in the Dolphins' defensive backfield with his former Gators teammate Jarvis Williams, and the pair were the Dolphins' starting safeties for the next five seasons.  Arguably Oliver's greatest career highlight was an October 4, 1992 interception of a pass thrown by Buffalo Bills quarterback Jim Kelly, which he returned 103 yards for a touchdown, and is the longest interception return in Dolphins history.

During his eight-year NFL career, Oliver played in 117 regular season games, started 101 of them, and recorded 544 tackles and 27 interceptions, two of which he returned for touchdowns.

Life after the NFL 

Following his professional football career, Oliver used his pro sports connections to launch a business as a professional party liaison for sports stars and celebrities in South Florida.  When his party connections began to dry up, he focused on the real estate market to become a specialist in high-end, up-market properties for celebrities, and is currently a general partner in a Miami-based real estate firm.

See also 

 1987 College Football All-America Team
 1988 College Football All-America Team
 Florida Gators football, 1980–89
 List of Florida Gators football All-Americans
 List of Florida Gators in the NFL Draft
 List of Miami Dolphins first-round draft picks
 List of Miami Dolphins players
 List of University of Florida alumni
 List of University of Florida Athletic Hall of Fame members

References

Bibliography 

 Carlson, Norm, University of Florida Football Vault: The History of the Florida Gators, Whitman Publishing, LLC, Atlanta, Georgia (2007).  .
 Golenbock, Peter, Go Gators!  An Oral History of Florida's Pursuit of Gridiron Glory, Legends Publishing, LLC, St. Petersburg, Florida (2002).  .
 Hairston, Jack, Tales from the Gator Swamp: A Collection of the Greatest Gator Stories Ever Told, Sports Publishing, LLC, Champaign, Illinois (2002).  .
 McCarthy, Kevin M.,  Fightin' Gators: A History of University of Florida Football, Arcadia Publishing, Mount Pleasant, South Carolina (2000).  .
 Nash, Noel, ed., The Gainesville Sun Presents The Greatest Moments in Florida Gators Football, Sports Publishing, Inc., Champaign, Illinois (1998).  .

1966 births
Living people
People from Belle Glade, Florida
Sportspeople from the Miami metropolitan area
Players of American football from Florida
African-American players of American football
American football safeties
Florida Gators football players
All-American college football players
Miami Dolphins players
Cincinnati Bengals players
Track and field athletes from Florida
Florida Gators men's track and field athletes
21st-century African-American people
20th-century African-American sportspeople